Six Degrees of Everything is a 30-minute American comedy reality show developed by Fine Brothers Entertainment & Marc Summers Productions for TruTV, and starring the Fine Brothers as the series hosts. The program debuted August 18, 2015 on TruTV.

Background
On January 22, 2015, it was revealed that Turner-owned cable network TruTV picked up 10 half-hour episodes of the show titled Six Degrees of Everything, as a series combining sketch comedy, man on the street interviews, and reality segments supported by original songs and music.  The series debut was aired on August 18, 2015, with episode 1.1 entitled "Einstein to Breast Implants", in which the Fine Brothers show how Albert Einstein connects with breast implants within six degrees of separation.

Plot
The Fine Brothers host comedy segments to illustrate how anything in the world can be connected by six degrees.

Cast
 Fine Brothers as themselves
 Joe Bereta as narrator
 Sara Fletcher as reporter
 Michael Q. Schmidt as Ben Franklin
 Emcee N.I.C.E. as Superman

Episodes

Critical response
Finny McCloud of "The World of TV & Film" said,"Benny & Rafi really express the rather unknown connections between objects in our world like how they found a connection between Edgar Allan Poe and the Hot Air Balloon."

After previewing the series' very first episode, Tom Conroy of Medialife Magazine concluded that although the "rules of TruTV’s Six Degrees of Everything are infinitely stretchable", the Fine Brothers' stretches "are strained and silly."  And in speaking only toward that first episode, decided that while the comedy shtick would be okay if in a shorter format, it overwhelms a 30-minute segment.

References

External links
 
 

TruTV original programming
2010s American sketch comedy television series
2015 American television series debuts
2015 American television series endings
English-language television shows